The William Dean 7 or Armstrong Class refers to a group of four prototype 4-4-0 double-frame locomotives built at the Swindon Works of the Great Western Railway in 1894.

History
They were nominal renewals of four of Dean's "experimental locomotives", Nos. 7, 8, 14 and 16. Had it not been for the recent derailing of one of his 3001 Class 2-2-2s in Box Tunnel, these engines would probably have been rebuilt as 2-2-2s; in the event they emerged as double-framed four-coupled engines with 7' driving wheels and a front bogie similar to that used on the 3031 Class.

Names
The four locomotives, which with their double-curved running plates were exceptionally handsome, were named as follows:

 7 Charles Saunders (first), Armstrong (second)
 8 Gooch
 14 Charles Saunders
 16 Brunel

Use
At the end of the 19th century the four locos ran between London and Bristol, but after about 1910 they were moved to Wolverhampton and worked north from there. Rather later, between 1915 and 1923, all four were rebuilt with  driving wheels and Standard No. 2 boilers, and became members of the Flower class. They were renumbered 4169-4172.

References

Sources

4-4-0 locomotives
Experimental locomotives
0007
Standard gauge steam locomotives of Great Britain
Passenger locomotives